Charles Porée (4 September 1675 – 11 January 1741) was a French priest, Jesuit, educator, orator, poet and homme de lettres. All his life, Voltaire, who was his pupil, kept a profound reverence for him.

Charles Porée was the son of Thomas Porée and Madeleine Richer from la Ferté-Macé. His brother Charles-Gabriel was also a writer.

Selected works 
 De Libris qui vulgo dicuntur romanenses, Discours prononcé le 25 février 1736 au collège Louis-le-Grand, Paris : Bordelet
 La Mandarinade, ou, Histoire comique du mandarinat de M. l’abbé de Saint-Martin, marquis de Miskou, À Siam [i.e. Caen] ; & se trouve à Caen, Chez Manoury fils, l’aîné, 1769
 Caecus Amor ou L’Amour aveugle
 Agapitus martyr
 Mauritius imperator
 Regulus
 Brutus primus Romanorum consul
 Discours sur la satire
 De theatro, Discours sur les spectacles, 1733
 De criticis oratio
 L’Homme instruit par le spectacle, ou le Théâtre changé en école de vertu

Modern editions 
 Théâtre jésuite néo-latin et Antiquité : sur le Brutus de Charles Porée (1708), éd. Édith Flamarion, Rome, École française de Rome, 2002, 530 p. 
 Discours sur la satire, éd. Luís dos Santos, Paris, 2005. 
 Discours sur les spectacles, éd. Édith Flamarion, Pierre Brumoy, Toulouse, Société de Littératures Classiques, 2000.

Bibliography 
 Joseph de La Servière, Un professeur d'Ancien Régime : Le père Charles Porée, S. J., 1676–1741, Oudin, 1899
 Georges Mancel, « Notice sur Charles Porée », Poètes normands, Éd. Louis-Henri Baratte, Paris, Amédée Bedelet, Martinon, Dutertre et Pilout, 1846
 M.Alleaume, Notice biographique & littéraire sur les deux Porée, page 87, in  Académie nationale des sciences, arts et belles-lettres de Caen, 1852

1675 births
1741 deaths
Writers from Normandy
17th-century French Jesuits
18th-century French Jesuits
French educational theorists
17th-century French educators
18th-century French educators
17th-century French male writers
18th-century French writers
18th-century French male writers
17th-century French dramatists and playwrights
18th-century French dramatists and playwrights
Lycée Louis-le-Grand teachers